The 2021 Stanley Cup Finals was the championship series of the National Hockey League's (NHL) 2020–21 season and the culmination of the 2021 Stanley Cup playoffs. The series was between the Montreal Canadiens and the defending champion Tampa Bay Lightning. The Lightning won the best-of-seven series, four games to one, for their second consecutive and the third overall championship in franchise history. Tampa Bay had home-ice advantage in the series with the better regular season record.

Due to the COVID-19 pandemic that both shortened and delayed the start of the regular season, the series began on June 28, 2021, and concluded on July 7, 2021, marking the first time that games in the Stanley Cup Finals were held in July. The cross-border travel restrictions under the pandemic also forced the league to temporarily realign this season into four divisions with no conferences, putting all seven Canadian teams into one of those divisions. Consequently, a divisional-based postseason format was held, featuring intra-divisional matchups in the first two rounds. The four divisional playoff champions were then re-seeded by regular season points in the Stanley Cup Semifinals, with the winners of the Semifinals advancing to the Stanley Cup Finals. Under a normal playoff format, this finals matchup would be impossible, as both the Lightning and Canadiens compete in the NHL's Eastern Conference. However, under the temporarily realigned divisions, some had mixed conferences, which enabled this scenario.

This was the first Finals since  to be played entirely in the Eastern Time Zone, the first since  to feature a Canadian-based team, and the first since  to end in a team winning the Stanley Cup at home.

This Finals matchup broke the Stanley Cup Finals record for highest combined seed between teams, with twenty-six (Tampa Bay eighth, and Montreal eighteenth). This record was previously held by the 1991 Stanley Cup Finals, which had a combined seed of twenty-three.

Paths to the Finals

Impact of COVID-19

The COVID-19 pandemic impacted the league for the second straight year with the Government of Canada maintaining its cross-border travel restrictions. Consequently, the league temporarily realigned for this season into four regional divisions with no conferences, putting all seven Canadian teams into one of those divisions. Each team played 56 regular season games, all intra-divisional matchups. The league returned to the traditional 16-team playoff format, with the first two rounds of the playoffs also featuring intra-divisional matchups. This format delayed any possibility of cross-border travel until the third round. The league explored the possibility of having the Canadian team that advanced to the third round hold their home games in a neutral NHL city in the U.S. but were granted a cross-border travel exemption approved by the Public Health Agency of Canada.

Due to local COVID-19 health protocols during the regular season, all 24 American teams hosted a limited amount of in-person spectators while all seven Canadian teams played behind closed doors. During the first three rounds of the playoffs, a number of U.S. teams further increased their capacity, and three of the Canadian playoff teams admitted spectators for the first time. The Canadiens were the first team from Canada to offer tickets to the general public. By the time the Finals started, Florida health officials had allowed the Lightning to admit 16,300 fans (85 percent of full capacity) at Amalie Arena for game 1, then allowed up to 100% capacity for game 2 and beyond. The Canadiens were permitted to issue 3,500 tickets for the Bell Centre after Quebec health officials denied the team's request to increase it to 10,500 fans (50 percent of capacity) before game 3.

Montreal Canadiens

This was the thirty-fifth Stanley Cup Finals appearance for this team. They have won the Stanley Cup a record twenty-four times (the second most championships in major North American sports behind the New York Yankees' twenty-seven World Series victories). They are the most recent Canadian team to win the Stanley Cup, doing so in 1993 (their most recent Finals appearance) against the Los Angeles Kings, winning in five games. They were also the first Canadian team since the 2011 Vancouver Canucks to reach the Finals.

During the offseason, the Canadiens traded left wing Max Domi and a third-round pick for right wing Josh Anderson. They also picked up forwards Tyler Toffoli, Michael Frolik, and Corey Perry in free agency. The team also re-signed goaltender Jake Allen and forward Brendan Gallagher. During the season, Hobey Baker Award winner and rookie Cole Caufield made his debut with the Canadiens. The team traded for forward Eric Staal as well as defencemen Jon Merrill and Erik Gustafsson.

On February 24, 2021, head coach Claude Julien was fired after coaching the team through parts of five seasons during his second stint as head coach of the Canadiens, which had registered a 9–5–4 record to start the season. Assistant coach Dominique Ducharme was named interim head coach.

The team finished with a record of 24–21–11 to finish fourth in the North Division. In the playoffs, the Canadiens came back from a 3–1 deficit in their series with their rival Toronto Maple Leafs to win in seven games, swept the Winnipeg Jets in the second round, and knocked off the Vegas Golden Knights in the Stanley Cup Semifinals in six games. 

As they have done in the past, the Canadiens chose to use the French version of the Stanley Cup Finals logo patch on their jerseys.

Tampa Bay Lightning

This was Tampa Bay's second consecutive Finals appearance and fourth overall, having won the previous year's Finals against the Dallas Stars in six games.

Tampa Bay made very few transactions to gain players in the offseason. They traded away Braydon Coburn and Cedric Paquette and let Zach Bogosian, Kevin Shattenkirk and Carter Verhaeghe walk via free agency. They re-signed Anthony Cirelli, Patrick Maroon, Luke Schenn, and Mikhail Sergachev. During the season, Tampa Bay traded for defenseman David Savard and traded away forward Alexander Volkov. Forward Nikita Kucherov, who had hip surgery prior to the regular season, returned for the playoffs.

Tampa Bay finished with a 36–17–3 record to finish third in the Central Division. In the playoffs, the Lightning defeated their intrastate rival, the Florida Panthers, in six games in the first round. The Lightning then triumphed over the Carolina Hurricanes in five games and in the Stanley Cup Semifinals, in a rematch of the previous year's Eastern Conference Final, they defeated the New York Islanders in seven games.

Game summaries
Note: The numbers in parentheses represent each player's total goals or assists to that point of the entire playoffs.

Game one

The Lightning took the lead early in the first period. With Tampa Bay defenseman Erik Cernak joining the rush with Ondrej Palat, Palat passed to an open Cernak who fired a wrist shot past Carey Price resulting in a 1–0 lead for Tampa Bay. In the second period, the Lightning grabbed a 2–0 lead when Blake Coleman's shot through traffic deflected off of Yanni Gourde and into the net. The Canadiens then halved the Lightning's lead as their offensive-zone coverage swept Tampa Bay's end setting up Ben Chiarot for a one-timer and Montreal's first goal of the game. The Lightning regained their two-goal lead in the third period when Nikita Kucherov's shot across the net got swatted by Chiarot and into his own net. After Brayden Point won a faceoff, the puck was picked up by Kucherov who fired a wrist shot past Price to gain a 4–1 lead. Towards the end of the third period and with frustrations boiling over for Montreal, Joel Edmundson took a roughing penalty with 2:40 left in the period. On the ensuing power-play, Kucherov passed to captain Steven Stamkos whose shot got past Price for a 5–1 lead, sealing the victory for the Lightning. The goal ended Montreal's penalty-killing streak at 32.

Game two

In game two, the Canadiens poured off more shots than in the first game. The first period saw Montreal make thirteen shots compared to Tampa Bay's six. However, neither team was able to score in the opening frame. In the second period, Montreal had more than double the shots of Tampa Bay, yet the Lightning ended up with two goals in contrast to the Canadiens' one. The first Lightning goal came from Anthony Cirelli, whose point shot pinballed in off of Carey Price's blocker and into the net. After Lightning defenceman Mikhail Sergachev committed an interference penalty on Artturi Lehkonen, Montreal tied the score on a power-play when Nick Suzuki floated a backhand shot through traffic and under Andrei Vasilevskiy's pads. With 1.1 seconds left in the second period, Tampa Bay forward Barclay Goodrow got past Ben Chiarot forcing a two-on-one with Blake Coleman. Goodrow passed it to Coleman who shot it past Price for the buzzer-beater. In the third period, Montreal continued to pressure the Lightning and Vasilevskiy, however, after a dump-in by Tampa Bay ended up in the Canadiens' zone, an errant pass off the boards by Joel Edmundson gave the puck away to Ondrej Palat, scoring the goal that made it 3–1. At the end of the game, both Corey Perry and Cirelli each received misconducts after an altercation.

Game three

In the first four minutes of the first period, the Lightning grabbed a 2–0 lead. The first goal came from a point shot through traffic by Jan Rutta. After Eric Staal shot the puck over the glass causing a power-play for Tampa Bay, Victor Hedman scored the second goal when his point shot bounced off of Carey Price and into the net. The Canadiens were able to score a goal within their seventeen shots as a two-on-one with captain Shea Weber and Phillip Danault allowed the latter's wrist shot to rip off both posts and past Andrei Vasilevskiy. In the second period, the Lightning followed the same momentum from the first period with another two goals in the first four minutes. When an errant change by Montreal created an opening for Ondrej Palat and Nikita Kucherov, Kucherov fired the puck past Price. At 3:33, the Lightning began another two-on-one rush during which Mathieu Joseph's shot rebounded to Tyler Johnson who scored to give Tampa Bay a 4–1 lead. However, just like the first period, Montreal scored which brought their deficit to two. Nick Suzuki, who drove down the right side of Tampa Bay's defensive zone, shot the puck under Vasilevskiy's pads. In the third period, the Lightning mainly held a defensive strategy. In the final five minutes, the Lightning gained a three-goal lead again when defenceman Erik Gustafsson gave the puck away to Johnson and he scored his second goal of the game. The Canadiens quickly rebounded after pulling their goalie and Corey Perry scored top-shelf over Vasilevskiy. However, with the empty net, the Lightning took advantage as Blake Coleman backhanded the puck into the net and the game ended 6–3.

Game four

In the first period, the Canadiens scored first, taking their first lead in the series, as Nick Suzuki made a pretty passing play to Josh Anderson who fired it past Andrei Vasilevskiy. The Lightning were able to continue pressuring the Canadiens into the second period. This pressure led to a backhand pass by Ryan McDonagh to Barclay Goodrow as he fired the puck into an open net. In the third period, Alexander Romanov fired a wrist shot from the blue line, scoring to make it 2–1 for Montreal. The Lightning tied it five minutes later when Mathieu Joseph sprung a two-on-one with Patrick Maroon and the latter scored, ending his goal-scoring drought. With the game tied 2–2 after the third period, both teams headed to overtime. In overtime, the Canadiens killed a double-minor penalty caused by Shea Weber and less than a minute later, Anderson put the puck past Vasilevskiy, preventing the first four-game sweep in the Finals since , and winning the game 3–2.

Game five

Tampa Bay dominated during the first period of game five, recording thirteen shots on target to the Canadiens' four, but neither team scored. The second period had the opposite trend, with the Canadiens getting ten shots compared to the Lightning's six shots. Nevertheless, it was Tampa Bay who scored the opening goal, when Ryan McDonagh set up a David Savard shot that was tipped in by Ross Colton. It would prove to be the only goal of the contest, Tampa Bay holding onto their one-goal lead throughout the third period, with Andrei Vasilevskiy recording a shutout. The 1–0 victory won the series for Tampa Bay and their second consecutive Stanley Cup.

Vasilevskiy was awarded the Conn Smythe Trophy as most valuable player during the playoffs. With their victory, the Lightning became the first team since the 1983 New York Islanders to win the Stanley Cup without winning an overtime game during the playoffs. Patrick Maroon won the Stanley Cup in three consecutive seasons, a feat which hadn't occurred since multiple members of the 1983 New York Islanders accomplished it. Maroon was the first player since Ed Litzenberger in 1963 to win the Stanley Cup in three consecutive years with two different teams.

Team rosters
Years indicated in boldface under the "Finals appearance" column signify that the player won the Stanley Cup in the given year.

Montreal Canadiens

Tampa Bay Lightning

Stanley Cup engraving
The Stanley Cup was presented to Lightning captain Steven Stamkos by NHL commissioner Gary Bettman following the Lightning's 1–0 win in Game 5.

The following Lightning players and staff qualified to have their names engraved on the Stanley Cup:

2020–21 Tampa Bay Lightning

Engraving notes
 #52 Cal Foote (D) played 35 regular-season games, but did not dress in the playoffs. He qualified to be engraved by playing in half of Tampa Bay's regular-season games.
 Al Murray was engraved in 2020 as Allen Murray, and in 2021 as A.L. Murray
 Patrick "Pat" Maroon won his third-straight Stanley Cup in 2019 with St. Louis, 2020 & 2021 with Tampa Bay Lighting. He is the first player to win three straight since many members of 1982, 1983 NY Islanders. He was also the first player since 1963 to win three cups in a row with two different teams. Eddie Litzenberger was last winning with 1961 Chicago, 1962 & 1963 Toronto.
 Tampa Bay did not request any extra players who did not officially qualify, be included on the cup. Instead four non-players members of 2020 & 2021 who did not get their names on the Stanley Cup in 2020 due to 52 team limit were added in 2021. Penny Vinik, Ryan Hamilton, Jean-Paul Cote, Ben Morgan. They now have two Stanley Cup rings in 2020 and 2021 and have their name on the Stanley Cup in 2021.

Player notes
These players were on the extended roster during the playoffs, with most having played regular-season games for Tampa Bay. None appeared in the playoffs. They received Stanley Cup rings, but were left off the Stanley Cup.
 Alex Barre-Boulet – 15 regular-season games
 Andreas Borgman – 7 regular-season games
 Mitchell Stephens – 7 regular-season games, 4 games with Syracuse of the AHL - 35 game injury no exemption requested. On cup in 2020
 Gemel Smith – 5 regular-season games
 Ben Thomas – 5 regular-season games
 Fredrik Claesson – 2 regular-season games with Tampa Bay, 4 with San Jose
 Christopher Gibson – 2 regular-season games
 Daniel Walcott – 1 regular-season game
 Boris Katchouk – 0 regular-season games, 29 games with Syracuse of the American Hockey League (AHL)
 Taylor Raddysh – 0 regular-season games, 27 games with Syracuse of the AHL
 Spencer Martin – 0 regular-season games, 15 games with Syracuse of the AHL
 All other members of 2021 Stanley Cup winning team left off the cup also received Stanley Cup rings 2021.

Media rights
With the series running through the first week of July, no games were held on either Canada Day (July 1) or American Independence Day (July 4) to avoid scheduling conflicts.

In Canada, this was the seventh consecutive Stanley Cup Finals broadcast by Sportsnet and CBC Television in English, and TVA Sports in French. The series was also streamed on Sportsnet Now and Rogers NHL Live.

In the United States, this was the sixteenth consecutive and final Stanley Cup Finals produced by NBC Sports under their ten-year contract for American television rights to the NHL. NBCSN aired the first two games, while NBC televised the rest of the series. When the series started, only the first two games were available on Peacock, NBC's streaming service. However, on July 2, the day of game three, NBCUniversal announced that the remainder of the series would also be available on Peacock. Under the new seven-year contracts that will begin next season, coverage of the Stanley Cup Finals will be rotated annually between ABC (who will broadcast its first Stanley Cup Finals since 2004) in even years and TNT (who will broadcast the Stanley Cup Finals for the first time ever in 2023) in odd years.

In Canada, Chris Cuthbert filled-in for Jim Hughson as Sportsnet lead play-by-play announcer after Hughson decided to not travel this season, and opted to only call national Vancouver Canucks home games due to COVID-19 pandemic. Hughson would later announce his retirement in September 2021.

In the U.S., Kenny Albert replaced the retired Mike "Doc" Emrick as NBC lead play-by-play announcer, having previously filled in for Emrick in game one of the 2014 Stanley Cup Finals due to a death in the latter's family. NBC lead color commentator Eddie Olczyk missed game two due to a personal matter, so "Inside-the-Glass" reporter Brian Boucher moved to the booth with Albert, and Pierre McGuire took over for Boucher between the benches. McGuire also called Game 3 of this series since Boucher missed that game for the same reason. After the Finals, Albert and Olczyk moved on to become TNT’s lead broadcast team (erstwhile NBC studio analyst Keith Jones was later added to join the pair), while Boucher joined ESPN/ABC. McGuire meanwhile, was hired by the Ottawa Senators as the team's senior vice-president of player development on July 12, having gone nearly three full decades without a managerial job in the NHL.

Meanwhile, the series averaged 2.52 million U.S. viewers, an increase from the 2.15 million average during the previous season's COVID-19-delayed Finals.

References

Navigation

 
2020–21 NHL season
Stanley Cup Finals
Stanley Cup Finals
Stanley Cup Finals
Montreal Canadiens games
Ice hockey competitions in Montreal
Stanley Cup Finals
2020s in Montreal
Tampa Bay Lightning games
Stanley Cup Finals
2020s in Tampa, Florida
Ice hockey competitions in Tampa, Florida